The Economic, Social and Cultural Council (ECOSOCC) is an advisory body of the African Union designed to give civil society organizations (CSOs) a voice within the AU institutions and decision-making processes. ECOSOCC is made up of civil society organizations from a wide range of sectors including labour, business and professional groups, service providers and policy think tanks, both from within Africa and the African diaspora.

The Interim President of ECOSOCC was Kenyan Nobel Prize winner Prof. Wangari Maathai. In 2008, she was replaced as President by Cameroonian lawyer Akere Muna of the Pan-African Lawyers Union (PALU).

Legal framework
ECOSOCC is provided for in the African Union Constitutive Act, but does not have its own protocol, relying rather on Statutes approved by the AU Assembly.  The ECOSOCC Statutes provide for four main bodies:

 A 150-member General Assembly, made up of 144 elected representatives (two from each Member State, ten operating at regional level, eight at continental level and 20 from the diaspora) and six representatives of CSOs nominated by the AU Commission, to be the highest decision-making body of the organ.
 A 15-member standing committee with representatives from the five regions of Africa to coordinate the work of the organ.
 10 sectoral cluster committees for feeding opinion and inputs into the policies and programmes of the AU.
 A five-person credentials committee for determining the eligibility of CSO representatives to contest elections or participate in the processes of the organ.

The 10 Sectoral Cluster  Committees are:

Peace and Security Committee
Political Affairs Committee
Infrastructure and Energy Committee
Social Affairs and Health Committee
Human Resources, Sciences and Technology Committee
Trade and Industry Committee
Rural Economy and Agriculture Committee
Economic Affairs Committee
Women and Gender Committee
Cross-Cutting Programs Committee

Membership criteria
The criteria established by the ECOSOCC Statutes for membership include that candidates should:

 Be national, regional, continental or African diaspora CSOs, without restriction to undertake regional or international activities.
 Have objectives and principles that are consistent with the principles and objectives of the Union.
 Be registered in a Member State of the African Union and/or meet the general conditions of eligibility for the granting of observer status to non governmental organizations.
 Show proof that the ownership and management of the CSO is made up of not less than 50% of Africans or African diaspora.
 Show that the resources of the organisation derive at least 50% from contributions of the members of the organization.

The requirements on funding from membership contributions mean that many African NGOs are not eligible for membership of ECOSOCC.

Establishment
Interim ECOSOCC structures were established in 2005. Elections to replace these structures were finally held in 23 African states and at continental level in late 2007.  Although elections had not been completed in the remaining countries, the official launch of the new ECOSOCC General Assembly took place in Dar es Salaam, Tanzania on 9 September 2008. 

The Citizens and Diaspora Office (CIDO) in the AU Commission acts as secretariat for ECOSOCC.

Membership of interim structures
The council also has four vice presidents. The interim presidents were:

 Central Africa.  M. Maurice Tadajeu
 North Africa. Mme. Fatima Zohra Karadja
 Southern Africa. Mr. Charles Mutasa
 West Africa.  Mr. Ayo Aderinwale

The Council also maintains a Standing Committee, whose interim members are listed below:

Central Africa
 Yvette N. Rekangali
 Jean Collins Musonda Kalusambo
 Julienne Mavoungou Makaya

East Africa

 Zainab Kamel Ali
 El Hussein Abdel Galil Mohammed
 Patrick Kayemba

North Africa

 Armany Asfour
 Saida Agrebi
 Ahmed Abdel Fattah

Southern Africa

 Moses Tito Kachima
 Joyce Nondwe Kanyago
 Helder Francisco Malauene

West Africa

 Mama Koite Doumbia
 Landing Badji
 Omar Gassama

President
Wangari Muthaai
Akum

External links 
 
 Economic, Social and Cultural Council on au.int